Brawlin is a small community in the north east part of the Riverina and situated about 12 kilometres south of Cootamundra and 29 kilometres north of Coolac.

Brawlin Post Office opened on 1 February 1880 and closed in 1951.

Brawlin is the site of a railway siding used to unload and upload goods, however that siding is no longer in operation.  The community location is only found by taking the Brawlin to Lockhart dirt road that runs west off the Coolac to Cootamundra road.

References

External links

 Brawlin Railway Siding

Towns in the Riverina
Towns in New South Wales
Cootamundra-Gundagai Regional Council